Jack Columbus Rittichier (August 17, 1933 – June 9, 1968) was the highest-ranked American Coast Guard officer killed during the Vietnam War and the first Coast Guardsman killed in action during the Vietnam War.

Lieutenant Rittichier, a decorated United States Coast Guard aviator, arrived in Vietnam around March 1968 as an exchange pilot to the United States Air Force's 37th Aerospace Rescue and Recovery Squadron which was based in Da Nang.  He was one of three Coast Guard exchange pilots who had arrived in Vietnam at this time.  Rittichier had distinguished himself as a helicopter rescue pilot, being awarded the Air Medal for saving lives on the Great Lakes.  Upon his graduation from Kent State University in 1955, he was commissioned a second lieutenant in the U.S. Air Force where he was trained to fly the B-47 Stratojet.  He left the Air Force as a captain in 1962.

On June 9, 1968, Rittichier and three Air Force crewmen took off in their Sikorsky MH-53 to rescue a Marine Corps pilot who had been shot down near the border with Laos.  While attempting this rescue, his helicopter was stuck with heavy ground fire and exploded while attempting to land.

The MVP award for Kent State University's Golden Flashes football team was named after their former captain as the Lt. Jack Columbus Rittichier Award.

References

External links
 

1933 births
1968 deaths
American military personnel killed in the Vietnam War
United States Coast Guard officers
United States Coast Guard personnel of the Vietnam War